Ringsend Public Library is an art deco style public library in Ringsend, Dublin designed by Robert Sorley Lawrie working in the city architect's office under Horace O'Rourke.

This building was one of four similar libraries built by Dublin Corporation between 1935 and 1940 in the Dublin suburbs of Phibsborough, Ringsend, Drumcondra and Inchicore.

See also
 Drumcondra Public Library
 Inchicore Public Library
 Phibsborough Public Library

References

Ringsend
Buildings and structures in Dublin (city)
Libraries in the Republic of Ireland
Art Deco architecture in the Republic of Ireland
Libraries established in 1937